Delphine Lecompte (born 22 January 1978) is a Flemish poet and columnist.

Career 

In 2010, she won the C. Buddingh'-prijs for her debut poetry collection De dieren in mij.

She also received the Prijs voor Letterkunde van de Provincie West-Vlaanderen in 2011 for this debut.

Controversy 

In 2021, she wrote a letter to Humo magazine in which she made several controversial comments regarding pedophilia. Her letter was condemned by Flemish ministers including Matthias Diependaele and Sammy Mahdi. The city of Bruges, which employs her as the official poet of a museum, did not endorse her views but recognised her right to free speech.

Publications 
 2009: De dieren in mij
 2010: Verzonnen prooi
 2012: Blinde gedichten
 2013: Schachten en amuletten
 2014: De baldadige walvis
 2015: Dichter, bokser, koningsdochter
 2017: Western
 2019: Vrolijke verwoesting
 2021: Beschermvrouwe van de verschoppelingen

Awards 
 2010: C. Buddingh'-prijs, De dieren in mij
 2011: Prijs voor Letterkunde van de Provincie West-Vlaanderen, De dieren in mij

References

External links 

 Delphine Lecompte (in Dutch), Digital Library for Dutch Literature
 Delphine Lecompte (in Dutch), Nederlandse Poëzie Encyclopedie (Dutch Poetry Encyclopedia)

1978 births
Living people
Flemish poets
Belgian columnists
Belgian women columnists
C. Buddingh' Prize winners
20th-century Belgian women
21st-century Belgian women
Controversies in Belgium